is a Japanese professional baseball pitcher for the Orix Buffaloes of the Nippon Professional Baseball (NPB).

International career 
Yamaoka represented the Japan national baseball team in the 2019 exhibition games against Mexico and 2019 WBSC Premier12.

On February 27, 2019, he was selected for Japan national baseball team at the 2019 exhibition games against Mexico.

On October 1, 2019, he was selected at the 2019 WBSC Premier12.

References

External links

 NPB.com

1995 births
Living people
Baseball people from Hiroshima Prefecture
Japanese baseball players
Nippon Professional Baseball pitchers
Orix Buffaloes players
2019 WBSC Premier12 players